"Moving to Blackwater" is the sixth single by Surrey-based rock band Reuben, and the third single taken from their debut album, Racecar Is Racecar Backwards. It was released in August 2004, and was also the first single that Reuben had ever released in the wake of an album. Opinion was divided as to whether or not it was the right choice to follow "Freddy Kreuger". It received only a small number of plays on radioactive the time and even fewer showings on TV. In spite of this, the single still managed to reach #59 in the UK singles chart, only six places down from its predecessor. It was released on CD and 7" vinyl format, with a special alternative B-side on the vinyl copies.

Track listings

CD
"Moving To Blackwater"
"Ways Of Staying Pure"
"Miffy in Auschwitz" (live at the BBC)

7" Vinyl
"Moving To Blackwater"
"Enemy"

Personnel
Jamie Lenman - Guitars, vocals, piano
Jon Pearce - Bass, vocals
Guy Davis - Drums
Jason Wilson (Stakeout Studios) - engineering, mixing and producing, track 1
Steven Down - recording, mixing and producing, track 2
Mitty (last name unknown) - engineering, track 3 at BBC Maida Vale Studios for Steve Lamacq's Radio One Evening Session

Trivia
(From the band's site)
The title track is the newest song on Racecar Is Racecar Backwards, written just before the band demoed the album. It was the first of Reuben's singles to feature a live string section. It's also the only other song on the album to feature Neil Lancaster's seven-string guitar playing.
Ways Of Staying Pure is an old track, a live favourite from the band's old Angel days that has since been more or less forgotten. It was recorded in the same session at Reading College that yielded Glitterskin, a song featured on the previous single Freddy Kreuger. The song was written in one rehearsal, when the band's old manager complained that they hadn't written any new material for some time.
"Miffy in Auschwitz" is an old band favourite. The song had previously appeared with Doll Fin, Stux and Glitterskin on the Peoplesound.com promo, and this particular version was taken from the band's first Radio 1 session in 2002. It is the first track taken from a BBC session to appear on a Reuben single.
"Enemy" is another Angel track, an earlier version of which can be found on their demo EP. It was the band's first track to be used on a compilation - Afterdarc's 'Packet Of Ten', a collection of tracks from Farnborough-based bands. This version was recorded at Jacob's studios in Farnham, which was the first time the band had recorded there since they did the original version of Let's Stop Hanging Out with Paul Tipler.
After listening to the song, many people mistakenly believe that singer frontman Jamie Lenman actually lives in Blackwater, which was nearly the case during preparation for the album, but in fact his parents decided to move to Ash Vale.
This single is the first to feature different b-sides on CD and vinyl versions.
All the vinyl copies were hand-numbered from 1-2500.
The video  for the single was filmed in Brighton with director Dan Fernbach. It was the first video for many things - the first to feature actors the band hadn't known previously; the first to be shot away from home on a specific location; the first to feature no band performance, and the first time the band had their own make-up lady.
The artwork for the single was put together for production by Frank Turner from fellow Xtra Mile band Million Dead.

2004 singles
Reuben (band) songs
2004 songs
Xtra Mile Recordings singles
Songs written by Jamie Lenman